Hudlice is a municipality and village in Beroun District in the Central Bohemian Region of the Czech Republic. It has about 1,200 inhabitants.

Administrative parts
Hudlice is made up of one administrative part.

Geography

It lies in the Křivoklát Highlands, in the Křivoklátsko Protected Landscape Area.

The village is situated in a steep slope of the Krušná hora hill. The historic part of the village follows a nameless creek, the right tributary of the Libotický creek. The main watercourses are Dibeřský and Libotický creeks. Dibeřský creek flows through Běstiny ravine, where Hudlice water source is placed. Libotický potok creek originates at north part of Hudlice, bypasses the village at the west, supplies three small ponds, bypasses the hill Kozlí hora and flows into the Dibřeský creek.

History
Wenceslaus Hajek writes in his chronicle the village was gifted by duke Jaromír to his servant Hovora. This story is considered as a romantical fabulation. The first written mention of Hudlice is from 1341.

After Karlštejn was founded in 1348, Hudlice was part of its estate until 1558, later transferred to the Křivoklát estate. From 1425 to 1437 there was a knight's court in Hudlice. The village changed its owners several times and its development was interrupted by the Hussite Wars and the Thirty Years' War.

Hudlice was heavily damaged in a time before the Thirty Years' War. The village was looted by mercenaries called by King Frederick V. Frederick V allowed villagers to catch soldiers and even making death sentences. Later, this attitude was not tolerated and punitive expedition was performed from Křivoklát Castle. Hudlice was looted by several armies of Mansfeld, Bucquoy, Thurn and Wallenstein. Twenty-two houses from the total count of 31 was destroyed.

It was not until around 1656 that the village flourished with the development of the ironworks. Iron ore and vermilion were mined and gold was panned in the streams. In the past, many miners mining iron ore lived here, the main source of which was the nearby mountain of Krušná hora until the 1960s. Charcoal was produced in the surrounding forests, which was used for iron furnaces.

In 1685, Hudlice was in possessions of the Wallenstein family, who opened iron mines. Mining was shortly stopped by high level of groundwater what was unsolvable complication for this time technology. Expansion of iron mining happened in 1731, when Hudlice was owned by the Fürstenberg family. Village population rose by numbers of workers coming from abroad. In a group of foreign workers was also a Jungmann family, whose sons were Josef Jungmann, the author of modern Czech vocabulary and Josef Jan Jungmann, founder of Czech obstetrics.

After World War I iron ore mining was interrupted except for quartzite mining, stone was used to build new highway Prague – Plzeň. Iron ore mining was renewed in 1924, opening new site Gabriela Mine. During World War II was built cableway, transporting iron ore to Králův Dvůr smeltery. In the end of World War I improvised Vlasov Army headquarters was placed in mines, bombarded by Germans. Air raid did not damage houses.

After World War II mines were nationalized by decree of Edvard Beneš. After communist coup d'état of 1948, it was decided to multiply iron ore production, ideally reaching national self-sufficiency. Land was made available to incoming miners to erect family houses. Mine rentability decreased rapidly and the mine was closed in 1967.

Demographics

Economy
No significant industry is situated in area. The municipality is a popular tourist destination for its location in the Křivoklátsko Protected Landscape Area.

A wastewater treatment plant is situated in the west of the municipal territory.

Transport
Hudlice is connected to Beroun by a public bus line.

Sights

The pseudo-Romanesque Church of St. Thomas is the main landmark of the municipality. It was built in 1874–1876 and replaced an old wooden church.

On the Krušná hora mountain, the wooden lookout tower Máminka is situated.

Hudlická skála Rock is popular for tourists as a natural landmark of the municipality. Below the top of the rock is the entrance to the only non-karst cave in the Beroun District.

In the birthplace of Josef Jungmann, the Josef Jungmann Monument is located. It is a typical old Czech timbered cottage from 1718. It contains original furniture, and an exhibition of his life and work is installed.

Notable people
Josef Jungmann (1773–1847), poet and linguist

References

External links

Villages in the Beroun District